Haikyu!! is an anime television series based on the manga series of the same name by Haruichi Furudate. The anime series produced by Production I.G., was announced in the manga's eighth volume. The story follows Shoyo Hinata, a boy determined to become a great volleyball player despite his small stature. It also focuses the Karasuno High School volleyball team and the relationship between players Shoyo Hinata and Tobio Kageyama.

The series' premiere aired from April 6 to September 21, 2014 on MBS, other JNN stations, and with English subtitles on Crunchyroll. It has been licensed for digital and home video release by Sentai Filmworks. A second season aired from October 4, 2015 to March 27, 2016. A third season, titled , aired from October 8 to December 10, 2016. Sentai Filmworks has also licensed the third season.
 
A fourth season, titled , was announced at the Jump Festa '19 event, with a "kickoff event" for the new series being held on September 22, 2019. The fourth season premiered on January 11, 2020 on the Super Animeism block. It was later announced that the fourth season would be split-cour, with the second half airing in July 2020. However, the second cour was delayed due to the COVID-19 pandemic, and aired from October 3 to December 19, 2020. Crunchyroll simulcasted the fourth season. The overall season 4 ran for 25 episodes. Recently, the anime series ran for 85 episodes overall. The series uses fourteen different songs for credits music: seven opening themes and seven ending themes.

Multiple OVA episodes have been released. "The Arrival of Lev!" was released on November 9, 2014 following the first season, "Vs. "Failing Grades"" was released on May 2, 2016 following the second season, and "Special Feature! Betting on the Spring High Volleyball" was released on August 4, 2017 following the third season. Two new OVA episodes, "Land vs. Sky" and "The Path of the Ball" were released on January 22, 2020 at the beginning of the fourth season.

Series overview

Episode list

Season 1 (2014)

Season 2 (2015–16)

Season 3 (2016)

Season 4 (2020)

See also
List of Haikyu!! chapters
List of Haikyu!! characters

International broadcast
The series is available for streaming with multilingual subtitles on iQIYI in South East Asia.

References

External links
 
 
 
 

Lists of anime episodes
Haikyu!! episode lists
Haikyu!!